Loco Locass are a Canadian hip hop group from Quebec formed in 1995. The group often defends the role of the French language, and champions Quebec sovereignty. Songs such as "ROC Rap" and "Résistance" highlight the band's political leanings, and their strong advocacy for Quebec to be an independent country. Their song "Le But" was previously used as the goal song of the Montreal Canadiens and was played after every goal the Canadiens scored at the Bell Centre until the start of the 2017-18 NHL Season. "Le But" was recently brought back as the Canadiens' victory song.

Beginnings
In 1999 the band adopted the name 'Locos Locass' and then changed it to 'Loco Locass', also adding new band member Chafiik (Mathieu Farhoud-Dionne). The band musicians besides the trio of Biz, Batlam and Chafiik are Jeanse, Djip, Lester G, VöV and Tchi Tchi Novo Solmol

Criticism and controversy
Loco Locass's self-image as a vehicle for promoting the sovereigntist option has played into existing social divisions.  These divisions have played out on several occasions:

St-Jean Concert: on June 24, 2005, the group took part in a show marking the government-designated Quebec National Holiday organised by Les Cowboys Fringants at Montréal's Parc Jean-Drapeau. The ten-hour politicized show's $40 entry fee was controversial, as was its sponsorship by Coca-Cola and Gillette, companies some left-wing nationalists identified as "Anglo-Saxon imperialists", leading to charges that the show constituted elitist competition with a long-established event at Parc Maisonneuve.

Federal Funding: Loco Locass are not among the sovereigntist artists whose political stance leads them to boycott federal funding programmes.  In particular, some of their recordings have received federal recording industry subsidies.  Federalists have charged that this poses an integrity problem, since they accept funding from the very level of government whose rejection they seek to promote. 

Federalists Leave Home: Biz was reported during the spring of 2006 as suggesting that those who do not support the sovereignty option should leave Quebec. Some also accuse Biz's of taking part of the history of accusations of disloyalty by nationalists.

Activism
On 25 February 2010, Chafiik of Loco Locass signed, together with 500 other artists, a call to support the international campaign for Boycott, Divestment and Sanctions against Israeli apartheid.

Documentary 
On August 19, 2005, in Rivière-du-Loup, Quebec, Loco Locass played five of their songs accompanied by a young string orchestra of musicians aged 12 to 17, an initiative of Camp Musical St-Alexandre director-conductor Mathieu Rivest.   The five songs were La censure pour l'échafaud, La bataille des murailles, L'empire du pire en pire, Antiaméricanisme primaire and Libérez-nous des libéraux, to which music by Prokofiev, Berlioz, and Stravinsky was added.  Partners included Télé-Québec, Vidéo Femmes and Audiogram, and a documentary entitled Symphonie Locass was released in the winter of 2006.

Awards 
Loco Locass won awards from:
 ADISQ (best hip-hop album for Amour Oral, 2005);
 CRIA-certified gold album for selling 50,000 copies of Amour Oral (2005);
 MuchMusic Video Awards (nominated for best French-language video, 2005);
 MusiquePlus (artist of the month, April 2005).

Discography
 Manifestif (2000)
 In Vivo (EP) (2003)
 Amour Oral (2004)
 Le Québec est mort, Vive le Québec ! (2012) #4 CAN

Other contributions
Malajube (2006) - "La russe"
Groupes de Pamplemousse (2008) - "Marie-Louise"
Le But (Allez Montréal), the goal song for the Montreal Canadiens from 2013 to 2017. Victory song 2018 to present

Videos
 Sheila Chu la (2002)
 Groove Grave (2005)
 Bonzaion (2005)
 Spleen & Montreal (2006)
 La bataille des murailles en symphonique (2006)
 La censure pour l'échafaud (2006)
 La Paix des Braves (featuring Samian) (2007)
 M'accrocher (2008)
 Hymne à Québec (2010)
 Le But (2010)

References

External links 
 Loco Locass Official site 
 Loco Locass at MySpace 
Loco Locass videos 

Canadian hip hop groups
Musical groups from Quebec
Audiogram (label) artists
Musical groups established in 1995
1995 establishments in Quebec
Quebec sovereigntists